Working Cabinet may refer to a number of presidential cabinets of Indonesia:

Djuanda Cabinet ('Working Cabinet'), 1957–1959
First Working Cabinet, 1959–1960
Second Working Cabinet (Sukarno), 1960–1962
Third Working Cabinet, 1962–1963
Fourth Working Cabinet, 1963–1964
Working Cabinet (2014–2019)
Onward Indonesia Cabinet, from 2019